Pope Heraclas (Theoclas) was the 13th Pope and Patriarch of Alexandria, reigning 232–248.

Pope Heraclas of Alexandria was born to pagan parents who became Christians and were baptized after his birth. They taught him the Greek philosophy, then Christian doctrine. He also studied the four gospels and the epistles. Demetrius, 12th Patriarch of Alexandria, ordained him deacon, then a priest over the church of Alexandria. He was successful in the ministry and was faithful in all that was entrusted to him. He followed Origen as head of the Catechetical School of Alexandria.

When Demetrius died, Heraclas was chosen as Patriarch. He converted many pagans and baptized them. He devoted his efforts to teaching, preaching and instructing. He assigned to St. Dionysius the work of judging between the believers, and taking care of their affairs. Pope Heraclas sat on the throne of St. Mark for 16 years until his death.

He was the first Patriarch of Alexandria to be referred to as "Pope" (in Greek, Papás), a term, originally a form of address meaning 'Father', that was used by several bishops). The first known record of this designation being assigned to Heraclas is in a letter written by the bishop of Rome, Dionysius, to Philemon:
τοῦτον ἐγὼ τὸν κανόνα καὶ τὸν τύπον παρὰ τοῦ μακαρίου πάπα ἡμῶν Ἡρακλᾶ παρέλαβον.[I received this rule and ordinance from our blessed Pope, Heraclas.]

References

General
 St. Heraclas (Theoclas), 13th Pope of Alexandria.

Atiya, Aziz S. The Coptic Encyclopedia. New York: Macmillan Publishing Co., 1991.

External links 
 The Official website of the Coptic Orthodox Pope of Alexandria and Patriarch of All Africa on the Holy See of Saint Mark the Apostle
 Coptic Documents in French
 

Saints from Roman Egypt
Egyptian theologians
3rd-century Popes and Patriarchs of Alexandria
3rd-century Christian saints
240 deaths
Year of birth unknown